My Lips Betray is a 1933 American pre-Code musical comedy film directed by John G. Blystone and starring Lilian Harvey, John Boles and El Brendel. The film's sets were designed by the art director Joseph C. Wright.

Plot
In a make-believe, middle-european kingdom, a vivacious but dim nation young lady works as a singer in a beer garden for her lease cash. In the mean time, the Ruler is confronting  bankruptcy for his small country, unless he weds a wealthy but undesirable Ruler of another Middle-European territory.
Eventually he takes in the struggling young singer, and they fall in love, despite possible bankruptcy and ruin.

Cast
 Lilian Harvey as Lili Wieler  
 John Boles as King Rupert aka Captain von Linden  
 El Brendel as Oswald Stigmat, Chauffeur  
 Irene Browne as Queen Mother Therese  
 Maude Eburne as Mamma Watscheck  
 Henry Stephenson as De Conti  
 Herman Bing as Weininger 
 Frank Atkinson as Baptiste, Royal Valet  
 Robert Barrat as Undetermined Role (uncredited)
 Tyler Brooke as Radio Announcer (uncredited)
 Albert Conti as Auto Salesman (uncredited) 
 Wild Bill Elliott as Auto Showroom Spectator (uncredited) 
 Bess Flowers as Dressmaker (uncredited)
 Vera Lewis as Gossipy Woman in Curlers (uncredited) 
 Bull Montana as Hamlet (uncredited)
 Paul Panzer as Beer Garden Patron (uncredited) 
 Dewey Robinson as Joseph Stein, Theatrical Agent (uncredited)
 Dorothy Vernon as Beer Garden Patron (uncredited)

Preservation
A Restored version was shown at the 2019 UCLA Festival of Preservation.

References

Bibliography
 Solomon, Aubrey. The Fox Film Corporation, 1915-1935. A History and Filmography. McFarland & Co, 2011.

External links
 

1933 films
1933 musical comedy films
American musical comedy films
Films directed by John G. Blystone
Fox Film films
Films set in Europe
American black-and-white films
1930s English-language films
1930s American films